Anna Karenina was a 1911 Russian short film directed by Maurice Maître.

Plot 
The film was based on the 1877 novel Anna Karenina by Leo Tolstoy.

Countess Anna Karenina vacillates between her lover, Vronsky, and her husband, Count Karenin. Anna's love for Vronsky causes her great pain and social pressure. Vronsky wants Anna to leave her husband, but Vronsky soon goes off to war, rendering her helpless. Anna feels lonely, begins to lose her mind, and eventually throws herself in front of a train.

Starring 
 M. Sorochtina as Anna Karenina
 M. Trojanov as Karenin
 Nikolai Vasilyev as Vronsky
 Mamonova
 A. Veskov

References

External links 
 

1911 films
1910s Russian-language films
Films based on Anna Karenina
Russian silent short films
1911 short films
Russian black-and-white films
Films of the Russian Empire